Power Rangers Zeo: Battle Racers is a Super NES racing video game released in September 1996 by Bandai.

The game was based on the Zeo generation of Power Rangers. It features Mode 7 graphics. The game allows for two-player or single-player split screen racing or battle mode.

Reception

GamePros The Feature Creature panned the game, criticizing the use of split screen even in single-player mode, and the stiff controls. He scored it a 2 out of 5 in every category (graphics, sound, control, and FunFactor).

References

External links
 Power Rangers Zeo: Battle Racers at GameFAQs

1996 video games
Bandai games
Natsume (company) games
North America-exclusive video games
Power Rangers video games
Racing video games
Super Nintendo Entertainment System games
Super Nintendo Entertainment System-only games
Vehicular combat games
Split-screen multiplayer games
Video games featuring female protagonists
Power Rangers Zeo
Multiplayer and single-player video games
Superhero video games
Video games developed in Japan
Video games scored by Hiroyuki Iwatsuki